USWeb was an interactive design agency founded in 1995 by former Novell executives Joe Firmage, Toby Corey, and Sheldon Laube during the dot com bubble. This included website design, backend engineering, usability, and one of the first SEO marketing practices. In 1999, the company merged with CKS, then later in 2001 became marchFIRST, before eventually going bankrupt.
 USWeb made its first public offering on the NASDAQ exchange in late 1997.

USWeb's business model focused on acquisitions of small, independent web design firms and their client bases for public stock as payment. Critics, including competitors and analysts, expressed skepticism citing doubts that USWeb would find a niche market in an industry that puts a high premium on innovation, and questioning its ability to sustain client retention and growth with its brand and services. 

In 1999, during the merger of USWeb and CKS, one of the founders and CEO of USWeb, Joseph P. Firmage, was asked to step down as CEO after he claimed to have been visited by extraterrestrials in his bedroom. Firmage publicly claimed that extraterrestrials had revealed advanced technologies to him and knowledge of alien civilizations.

After Joe Firmage was dismissed from USWeb/CKS, Robert Shaw assumed the role of CEO of the merged company in 1999. Shaw was subsequently dismissed from the company in 2001 after it merged with Whittmann-Hart then changed its name to marchFIRST. marchFIRST, Inc. was a short-lived international systems integrator and internet consulting company and was a Nasdaq traded public company whose peak stock price reached $52. By the time the company filed for bankruptcy, it traded for pennies ($0.16 on March 28, 2001). On March 13, 2001 the company leadership resigned, and on April 12, 2001, the company filed for Chapter 11 bankruptcy protection. In May 2001, the company was dissolved.

References

Marketing companies established in 1995
1997 initial public offerings
Digital marketing companies of the United States